Hans Wigren (born 26 October 1940) is a Swedish actor. He has appeared in more than 25 films and television shows since 1962.

Selected filmography
 Dear John (1964)
 Sally and Freedom (1981)
 Underground Secrets (1991)
 The Marriage of Gustav III (2001)

References

External links

1940 births
Living people
20th-century Swedish male actors
21st-century Swedish male actors
Swedish male film actors
Swedish male television actors
People from Umeå